Rosolino Paternò, soldato... (also known as Operation Snafu and Situation Normal: A.F.U) is a 1970 Italian comedy film. The film stars Martin Landau, Jason Robards, and Peter Falk. In the title role is Nino Manfredi.

Plot
Sicily, 1943, before the Allied assault in July. A pair of American commandos parachute inside the island for a secret mission. They are asked to check on the German weapons and positions before the assault. Along the way, they meet a wounded Italian prisoner of war. He agrees to help them complete their mission, provided there are no bumps in the road and no Germans thrown in.

Cast 
 Nino Manfredi as Rosolino Paternò
 Jason Robards as Sam Armstrong
 Martin Landau as Joe Mellone
 Peter Falk as Peter Pawney
 Scott Hylands as Reginald Wollington
 Milena Vukotic as Rosolino's wife
 Frank Latimore as the American Lieutenant
 Anthony Dawson as the Italian General
 Slim Pickens as General Maxwell
 Lorenza Guerrieri as Vincenzina Puglisi
 Renzo Marignano
 Mario Maranzana
 Orso Maria Guerrini

Production
The film was filmed in Licata and Agrigento. It was completely shot in English, with great difficulty for the lead actor Nino Manfredi due to his lacking of English language skills. The English-language version took its title from the American anacronym
during the war used for situational conditions before any sanctioned mission by the military: SNAFU, meaning Situation Normal, All Fouled Up.

References

External links

1970 films
1970 comedy films
1970s English-language films
English-language Italian films
Italian comedy films
Films directed by Nanni Loy
Films scored by Carlo Rustichelli
Films set in Sicily
Italian Campaign of World War II films
Military humor in film
1970s Italian films